Oh Good Grief! is the 10th studio album by Vince Guaraldi, released in the U.S. in May 1968. The album was the artist's first release with Warner Bros.-Seven Arts after leaving Fantasy Records in 1966.

Background
Vince Guaraldi's final three albums released during his lifetime were recorded for Warner Bros.-Seven Arts after spending considerable time struggling to extricate himself from Fantasy Records. Warner signed Guaraldi to a three-record deal, and insisted that his inaugural release consist of his Peanuts songs. This was done in part to help fill the void left by a lack of soundtrack albums to accompany the successful television specials, Charlie Brown's All Stars!, It's the Great Pumpkin, Charlie Brown (both 1966), You're in Love, Charlie Brown (1967) and He's Your Dog, Charlie Brown (1968). Guaraldi responded with Oh Good Grief!, featuring new renditions of eight of his most popular scores from those programs and experimenting with electric keyboard and electric harpsichord.

A remastered edition of Oh Good Grief! was released on July 6, 2018, by Omnivore Recordings as part of the 2-CD set The Complete Warner Bros.–Seven Arts Recordings. To celebrate its 50th anniversary, the album was also released on translucent red vinyl.

Reception

Commercial performance
Oh Good Grief! charted on the Billboard Best Selling Jazz LPs chart for two consecutive weeks starting the week of June 29, 1968, where it peaked at No. 20.

Critical reception
AllMusic critic Richard S. Ginell observed, "by this time, like several other pianists, Guaraldi was actively exploring the new sonic horizons offered by electronic keyboards, and so he superimposes layers of electric harpsichord on most of these tracks. Some of the old sardonic spontaneity goes over the side, replaced by an overloaded gee-whiz atmosphere that sometimes gets in the way of the quartet's willingness to swing. But the tunes are marvelous, and since so little of Guaraldi's vast Peanuts output was ever made available, every millisecond of these jazz waltzes, bossa novas and soulful ruminations on Charlie Brown's world becomes cherishable."

Guaraldi historian and biographer Derrick Bang noted that the songs are "presented in a manner wholly unlike the quieter trio sound found on [Jazz Impressions of] A Boy Named Charlie Brown and A Charlie Brown Christmas," noting that the album contains, "the jazziest, swinging-est collection of his Peanuts themes that Guaraldi ever released." Bang cited the arrangement of "Linus and Lucy," as "smokin'", adding that the song is "dominated by Guaraldi's percussive piano attack in the foreground, augmented by harpsichord shading in the background. His acoustic improv bridges never have been better, making this his most vibrant recorded version of what, by now, had become his second signature tune, after 'Cast Your Fate to the Wind'." Bang also pointed to "Red Baron" as the "stand-out", noting that it begins with a "similarly ferocious left-hand piano vamp and then cuts to a fast-paced arrangement of the melody on both piano and harpsichord."

Both Ginell and Bang agreed that the length of the album was "maddeningly short."

Track listing

Charts

Weekly charts

Personnel
Vince Guaraldi Quartet
Vince Guaraldi – piano, electric harpsichord
Eddie Duran – guitar
Stanley Gilbert – double bass
Carl Burnett – drums

Production
Vince Guaraldi  – arranger, producer
Leo Kulka – engineer
Ed Thrasher – art director
Charles M. Schulz – cover artwork

References

External links
 

1968 albums
Vince Guaraldi albums
Warner Records albums
Albums arranged by Vince Guaraldi
Cool jazz albums
Mainstream jazz albums
Peanuts music